Flaminio Filonardi (died 12 September 1608) was a Roman Catholic prelate who served as Bishop of Aquino (1579–1608).

Biography
On 13 November 1579, Flaminio Filonardi was appointed during the papacy of Pope Gregory XIII as Bishop of Aquino. On 8 December 1579, he was consecrated bishop by Giulio Antonio Santorio, Cardinal-Priest of San Bartolomeo all'Isola, with Fabio Mirto Frangipani, Titular Archbishop of Nazareth, Massimiliano Palumbara, Archbishop of Benevento, and Giovanni Battista Santorio, Bishop of Alife, serving as co-consecrators. He served as Bishop of Aquino until his death on 12 September 1608.

Episcopal succession
While bishop, he was the principal co-consecrator of:

References

External links and additional sources
 (for Chronology of Bishops) 
 (for Chronology of Bishops) 

16th-century Italian Roman Catholic bishops
17th-century Italian Roman Catholic bishops
Bishops appointed by Pope Gregory XIII
1608 deaths